Estonian Americans are Americans who are of Estonian ancestry, mainly descendants of people who left Estonia before and especially during World War II. According to the 2021 American Community Survey, around 29,000 Americans reported full or partial Estonian ancestry, up from 26,762 in 1990.

History

Estonians first started coming to the United States as early as in 1627 in the colony of New Sweden along the Delaware River. Significant numbers of emigration started in the late 19th century and continued until the mid-20th century. However, it is difficult to estimate the number of Estonian-Americans before 1920, since such immigrants were often characterized as Russians in the national censuses. 

The beginnings of industrialization and commercial agriculture in the Russian Empire transformed Estonian farmers into migrants. The pressures of industrialization drove numerous Estonian peasants to emigrate to the United States continuing until the outbreak of World War II. In 1944, in the face of the country being re-occupied by the Red Army, 80,000 people fled from Estonia by sea to Germany and Sweden, becoming war refugees and later, expatriates. 

Some thousand of them moved on from there and settled in the United States. After the war's end, these displaced persons were allowed to immigrate to the United States and to apply for citizenship. In 1948, the Displaced Persons Act from U.S. Congress stipulated that 40% of the available visas go to “Baltic” people (Estonians, Latvians, and Lithuanians). This act and its 1950 revision allowed 11,000 Estonians into the United States between 1948 and 1952. Some of these refugees and their descendants started returning to Estonia at the end of the 1980s.

Notable people

President Franklin Delano Roosevelt descended from 17th-century Tallinner colonists in New Amsterdam.

Conductor Neeme Järvi was the music director of the Detroit Symphony Orchestra, the New Jersey Symphony Orchestra, as well as the international Gothenburg Symphony, and Het Residentie Orkest of The Hague. His three children, conductors Paavo Järvi and Kristjan Järvi, and flautist Maarika Järvi, are prominent American musicians in their own right. Paavo Järvi is the chief conductor of the Cincinnati Symphony Orchestra.

Chemist Lauri Vaska emigrated to United States in 1949. He is distinguished for his research in organometallic chemistry, winning the prestigious Boris Pregel Award. Hillar Rootare, a materials scientist, is best known for his work in the development of mercury porosimetry, high pressure liquid chromatography, and the formulation of the Rootare-Prenzlow Equation.

In journalism, Edmund S. Valtman, a successful editorial cartoonist, won the Pulitzer Prize for Editorial Cartooning.

Ene Riisna is an Estonian-born American award-winning television producer, known for her work on the American news program 20/20.

Alar Toomre is an astronomer recognized for his research on the dynamics of galaxies. The Toomre sequence and Toomre Instability are named in his honor.

In entertainment, singer and actress Miliza Korjus was nominated for an Academy Award for her performance in the 1938 film The Great Waltz.

Hollywood actor Johann Urb (born January 24, 1977) is an Estonian living and working in the United States.

Kerli Kõiv (born February 7, 1987), better known mononymously as Kerli, is an Estonian pop singer residing in the United States since 2005.

Psychologist, psychobiologist and neuroscientist Jaak Panksepp (born June 5, 1943) coined the term 'affective neuroscience', the name for the field that studies the neural mechanisms of emotion.

Mena Suvari (born February 13, 1979) is an American actress, fashion designer, and model.

Toomas Hendrik Ilves, born December 26, 1953, in Sweden but raised in New Jersey, was the President of Estonia.

See also

 European Americans
 Hyphenated American
 New York Estonian House
 Estonia–United States relations

References

Further reading
 Aun, K. The Political Refugees: A History of Estonians in Canada (McClelland and Stewart, 1985)
 Granquist, Mark A. "Estonian Americans." in Gale Encyclopedia of Multicultural America, edited by Thomas Riggs, (3rd ed., vol. 2, Gale, 2014), pp. 97-106. Online
 Kulu, H. and Tammaru, T. "Ethnic return migration from the East and the West: the case of Estonia in the 1990s", Europe-Asia Studies (2000) 52#2: 349�69.

 Tannberg, Kersti, and Tönu Parming. Aspects of Cultural Life: Sources for the Study of Estonians in America (New York: Estonian Learned Society in America, 1979).
 "Estonians" in Stephan Thernstrom, Ann Orlov and Oscar Handlin, eds. Harvard Encyclopedia of American Ethnic Groups (1980) Online
 Tammaru, Tiit, Kaja Kumer-Haukanõmm, and Kristi Anniste. "The formation and development of the Estonian diaspora." Journal of Ethnic and Migration Studies 36.7 (2010): 1157-1174. online
 Walko, M. Ann. Rejecting the Second Generation Hypothesis: Maintaining Estonian Ethnicity in Lakewood, New Jersey'' (AMS Press, 1989).

External links
Estonian Americans at Countries and Their Cultures

 
 
European-American society
United States